Alan Noel Edwin Waldron (23 December 1920 – 2 September 1999) was an English first-class cricketer. Waldron was a right-handed batsman who bowled right-arm fast-medium.

Waldron made his first-class debut for Hampshire in 1948 against Cambridge University. Waldron played his second and final match for Hampshire in the same season against a Combined Services team.

That same season Waldron played two first-class matches for the Combined Services against Glamorgan and Worcestershire.

Waldron died at Richmond, Greater London on 2 September 1999.

External links
Alan Waldron at Cricinfo
Alan Waldron at CricketArchive

1920 births
1999 deaths
People from Southsea
English cricketers
Hampshire cricketers
Combined Services cricketers